Miss Behave is a teen drama web series produced between June 2010 and July 2012. Created and executive produced by Susan Bernhardt, it stars Jillian Clare as Malibu teen Victoria "Tori" Archer and is streamed at www.MissBehave.tv.

Cast
 Jillian Clare as Victoria "Tori" Archer
 Brett DelBuono as Dylan
 Jenna Stone as Danielle
 Trevor Nelson as William "Billy" Archer
 Bianca Magick as Tasha
 Jamison Tate as Christian
 James Rustin as Alex
 Michael Bolten as Noah
 Marco James as Riley
 Jacee Jule as Kristina
 Patrika Darbo as Dr. Freed
 Darin Brooks as Blake Owens
 Eric Martsolf as Marcus Dunne
 Terri Garber as Elizabeth "The Queen" Archer (guest)
 Bobby Preston as Cody
 Madisen Beaty as Sam

Production
In 2012, Garber was cast as Tori's mother Elizabeth Archer for the series finale episode, and a spin-off series called Reign, starring Garber, was announced.

Awards and nominations

References

External links
 
 
 
 
 
 

2010s American LGBT-related drama television series
2010s American teen drama television series
2010 American television series debuts
2012 American television series endings
Internet soap operas
American LGBT-related web series
Television series about teenagers
Television shows set in Los Angeles
American drama web series